James Hanson may refer to: 

* James Hanson, Baron Hanson (1922–2004), English industrialist 
 Jimmy Hanson (footballer, born 1904) (1904–?), English footballer for Manchester United
 James Hanson (footballer, born 1987), English footballer for Grimsby Town
 Jamie Hanson (born 1995), English footballer for Derby County
 James Hanson (rugby union) (born 1988), Australian rugby union player (hooker) for Queensland Reds
 James C. Hanson (1862–1946), American politician

See also 

 James Hansen (disambiguation)